Louisa Chirico was the defending champion, but chose to participate in Stuttgart instead.

Rebecca Peterson won the title, defeating Taylor Townsend in the final, 6–4, 6–2.

Seeds

Main draw

Finals

Top half

Bottom half

References 
 Main draw

Hardee's Pro Classic - Singles
Hardee's Pro Classic